There are several rivers named Das Almas River or Rio das Almas in Brazil:

 Das Almas River (Bahia)
 Das Almas River (Goiás)
 Das Almas River (Maranhão)
 Das Almas River (São Paulo)
 Das Almas River (Tocantins)

See also
 Das Palmas River, Goiás, Brazil